Hassan Ibrahim Ali (born 4 November 1996) is a Somali footballer who plays as a goalkeeper for Dekedaha and the Somalia national football team.

Club career
As of 2014, Ali was playing for Savana. In 2019, Ali signed for Dekedaha, winning the Somali First Division in his first season at the club.

International career
After previously representing Somalia at under-23 level, Ali made his debut for Somalia in a 3–0 loss against Rwanda in the 2015 CECAFA Cup.

References

1996 births
Living people
Association football goalkeepers
Somalian footballers
Somalia international footballers